Tolkyn Zabirova (born 17 October 1970 in Ayagoz) is a singer from Ayagoz, Kazakhstan. Most of her songs are in Kazakh or Russian, though several exist in other languages.

External links
 Official site (in English and Russian)

1970 births
Living people
People from Ayagoz
20th-century Kazakhstani women singers
21st-century Kazakhstani women singers